Copadichromis pleurostigma is a species of haplochromine cichlid which is endemic to Lake Malawi. It is occurs throughout the lake and therefore is found in Malawi, Mozambique, and Tanzania.

References

pleurostigma
Taxa named by Ethelwynn Trewavas
Fish described in 1935
Taxonomy articles created by Polbot